USS Brilliant may refer to the following ships operated by the United States Navy:

 , a steamer in commission from 1862 to 1865
 , was the commercial tug Brilliant, registered for U.S. Navy service during World War I but never commissioned

United States Navy ship names